The Mooknayak is an online news portal which reports everyday atrocities against the deprived, exploited and backward sections of the society. The Mooknayak is based on the ideas of Bahujans like Dr B. R. Ambedkar, the architect of India's constitution, social reformer Phule, Birsa, Periyar, Fatima Sheikh, Kanshi Ram. It was started by well known Dalit journalist Meena Kotwal.<ref name="Singh 2023"><ref>

References

External links
 100 Years of Mooknayak, Ambedkar's First Newspaper that Changed Dalit Politics Forever (The Wire, 2020)
 Dalit journalist takes aim at changing history with stories of India’s marginalized 

Mooknayak